Andrea Stassou (born July 30, 1970) is an American television journalist. She was born in Englewood Cliffs, New Jersey. She has worked at both the local and network levels, covering major stories such as the 9/11 attacks, the crash of TWA Flight 800, the death of JFK Jr., and the Columbia space shuttle disaster.

Stassou served as anchor of the CBS News overnight broadcast Up to the Minute and CBS This Morning, which precedes The Early Show, after many stints across the country as an anchor and reporter at various affiliates.

Stassou worked as a reporter and weekend anchor for WCBS-TV in New York from 2003 to 2008. During her time there, she served as a general assignment reporter and solo anchored the 6 p.m. and 11 p.m. weekend newscasts.  She joined WCBS-TV from ABC News where she was co-anchor of World News Now since 2002, with David Muir. Prior to that, she worked as the weekend anchor and weeknight reporter at the NBC affiliate in Boston, WHDH-TV. She also worked as an anchor and reporter at WTNH-TV in New Haven, CT, and WGGB-TV, in Springfield, MA.

Stassou graduated cum laude from the University of Pennsylvania and holds a master's degree in science} from the Medill School of Journalism at Northwestern University, where she completed a 16-month accelerated program.

Stassou is involved in many philanthropic endeavors, including the MS Society, the Triple Negative Breast Cancer Foundation and several Hellenic organizations. Stassou, who is of Greek descent, was honored by HANAC in 2003, for her work as a television journalist. She was also honored in 2013 by the Philoptochos Society of Manhattan's Holy Trinity Greek Orthodox church, alongside other well known anchors of Greek descent, including Ernie Anastos and Nick Gregory, both of Fox.

Stassou resides in her home state of New Jersey, with her husband, Elias Dokas, and their two children, Peter and Katerina. Andrea is currently working for the international classical crossover artist, Mario Frangoulis, heading marketing efforts for all of Frangoulis' shows, appearances, recording projects and media opportunities in the United States and Canada. She also serves as an MC and fundraiser for many charitable organizations across the country.

References 

American television reporters and correspondents
American television news anchors
Living people
Medill School of Journalism alumni
University of Pennsylvania alumni
People from Englewood Cliffs, New Jersey
Journalists from New Jersey
1970 births